Heterosamara is a genus of flowering plants belonging to the family Polygalaceae.

Its native range is Guinea, Western Central Tropical Africa to Southern Africa.

Species:

Heterosamara bennae 
Heterosamara cabrae 
Heterosamara carrissoana 
Heterosamara galpinii 
Heterosamara mannii

References

Polygalaceae
Fabales genera